Heiko Daxl (21 September 1957 – 21 May 2012) was a German media artist, exhibition curator, art gallery owner and design / art collector. Born in Oldenburg, Germany, he lived and worked in Berlin and Zagreb.

Life 
Until 1976 he grew up in Varel, Dangast and Neuenburg next to Jadebusen in the (Friesland (district)). During his education at the Lothar Meyer High-School he learned about the medium film. He first studied architecture and urbanism at the Technical University Braunschweig (1978), but changed to the University of Osnabrück, which offered at that time in Germany a unique course of studies in communication and aesthetics. There he studied art history with Franz Joachim Verspohl, Walter Grasskamp, Lothar Knapp and Jutta Held as well as media studies with Joachim Paech, Werner Faulstich, Walter Fähnders, Peter von Rueden, Ingo Petzke and Wolfgang Becker,. Here he was conferred his Magister Artium degree in 1985. He also studied German Language and Literature at the Technical University Berlin and Art History at the University of Zurich.

Work 
In 1980 he founded, with others under the guidance of Ingo Petzke, the Experimental Film Workshop Osnabrück, an annual festival for experimental film art, which in 1988 became the European Media Art Festival (EMAF). Daxl was till 1992 considerably involved in the shaping of this worldwide important forum for media art. From 1987 he has participated in Goethe-Institut cultural exchange programmes, visiting more than 50 countries in Europe, America, Asia and Australia.

Together with Evgenija Dimitrieva and Keiko Sei, in 1990 to 1991 he edited the tenth and last edition of the international video art magazine INFERMENTAL in Skopje and Osnabrück. He met his wife and partner Ingeborg Fülepp through a Goethe-Institut cultural exchange programme. In 1991 they established the exhibition series Media Scape of international media art, initially at the Mimara Museum and later at the Museum for Contemporary Art in Zagreb (until 1999) and the Galerija Rigo and Muzej Lapidarium in Novigrad, Istria (Cittánova), Istria, Croatia (from 2005). In 2006 this exhibition series was extended in co-operation with Noam Braslavsky under the title "Strictly Berlin" at the Galerie der Künste (GdK), Berlin.

Daxl and Fülepp have worked together since 1990 under the name "mediainmotion" and "dafü®" within film, video art, visual music, CD-ROM, DVD, digital art, graphics, photo, installation and Mixed Media. Through their teaching and involvement with the electroacoustic music department of the Akademie der Künste in Berlin (1995–2002) they have worked with contemporary composers such as Georg Katzer, Wolfgang Rihm, Milko Kelemen, Mona Mur, Jorge Reyes (musician), Steve Roach (musician), Amnon Wolman, Dror Feiler, Masami Akita (Merzbow), Zbigniew Karkowski, Elliott Sharp, Igor Kuljerić, Ivo Josipović and Ensemble Modern.

Heiko Daxl and Ingeborg Fülepp are renowned video and media artists who are at home in Berlin and in Zagreb and who are recognized in both cities. Since 1991 they work together as an artistic couple. The numerous works they have created bear witness to their joy of experimenting, always moving on the borderline to the unknown. Employing new technologies, they investigate different, so far unknown optic and acoustic phenomena. The observer's senses, his hearing, his sight and his touch, are always consciously engaged, irritating his perception. Daxl and Fülepp show new ways in the artistic exploration of the technical possibilities of creating sounds and abstract images which force the observer to an integrated reception. They seek to make the recipient think about the reality which is imparted to him in an artificial and technical way.
Dr. Barbara Barsch, Director, ifa-Galerie Berlin, Institute for International Relations , May 2005

Exhibitions 
They have had work commissioned by Budge-Palais (Hamburg), Darmstädter Ferienkurse for New Music (Darmstadt), Musik der Jahrhunderte (Stuttgart), Donaueschinger Musiktage (Donaueschingen Festival for Contemporary classical music), Bayerische Staatsoper München, Lehmbruck-Museum Duisburg, Photokina Köln Toshiba Tokyo, Magyar Televízió Budapest, Südwestrundfunk Stuttgart, Music Biennale Zagreb, Prussian Cultural Heritage Foundation (Stiftung Preussischer Kulturbesitz Berlin)  Berlin State Museums (Staatliche Museen zu Berlin), Neue Nationalgalerie Berlin, Goethe-Institut, INFERMENTAL, Budapest.

Daxl has participated in festivals and exhibitions throughout the world.

References 

 Heiko Daxl: "Musik des Lichts" in Ingo Petzke (Hg.): Das Experimentalfilm-Handbuch, Schriftenreihe des deutschen Filmmuseums'', Frankfurt am Main 1989 (only in German)
 Infermental
 Vortex/sonambiente
 International Media Art Award 2000
 Virtual portal to Croatian Culture

External links 
 Heiko Daxl/Ingeborg Fülepp
 Mediainmotion Videochannel
 Heiko Daxl at artfacts.net
 Media-Scape
 Strictly Berlin
 Galerie der Künste, Berlin
 Announcement of Heiko Daxl's death

1957 births
2012 deaths
People from Oldenburg (city)
German contemporary artists
German digital artists
German installation artists
German curators
German video artists